Charleston red rice or Savannah red rice is a rice dish commonly found along the Southeastern coastal regions of Georgia and South Carolina, known simply as red rice by natives of the region.

This traditional meal was brought over to the U.S. by enslaved Africans originating from the West Coast of Africa. This cultural foodway is almost always synonymous with the Gullah or Geechee people and heritage that are still prevalent throughout the coastal regions of South Carolina and Georgia. The main component of the dish consists of the cooking of white rice with crushed tomatoes instead of water and small bits of bacon or smoked pork sausage. Celery, bell peppers, and onions are the traditional vegetables used for seasoning.

The dish bears resemblance to African dishes, particularly the Senegambian dish thieboudienne, suggesting a creolization of the dish from West Africa to the New World. It also bears a resemblance to jollof rice.

See also
List of regional dishes of the United States

References

American rice dishes
Lowcountry cuisine
Gullah culture
Soul food